Wudian is a town under the administration of the county-level city of Guangshui in northern Hubei province, China, abutting the western edge of the Daba Mountains and  northeast of downtown Suizhou. , it has 1 community and 14 villages under its administration.

Administrative divisions 
One community:
Dongmenlou

Fourteen villages:
Shuangxiang, Quankou, Louziwan, Shuanggang, Donghe, Wangzidian, Zhongxin, Dongwan, Yangjia'ao, Zhimawan, Jiangxidian, Santumen, Tangfan, Xujiashan

See also 
 List of township-level divisions of Hubei

References 

Township-level divisions of Hubei